Notonomus molestus is a species of ground beetle in the subfamily Pterostichinae. It was described by Maximilien Chaudoir in 1865.

References

Notonomus
Beetles described in 1865